NGC 6925 is an unbarred spiral galaxy in the constellation Microscopium of apparent magnitude 11.3. It is lens-shaped, as it lies almost edge on to observers on Earth. It lies 3.7 degrees west-northwest of Alpha Microscopii.

SN 2011ei, a Type II supernova in NGC 6925, was discovered by Stu Parker in New Zealand in July 2011.

References

6925
IC objects
064980
Unbarred spiral galaxies
Microscopium